Renato Pagliari (28 June 1940 – 29 July 2009) was an Italian tenor, who was the lead vocalist alongside Hilary Lister in the short-lived 1980s pop duo Renée and Renato.
 
The pop duo were best known for their UK Christmas Number 1 hit from 1982, "Save Your Love", which remained at the top of the charts for four weeks.

Biography 
 
Pagliari was born into a large impoverished family in Blera, Lazio, Rome, in 1940, where he exhibited a musical aptitude from an early age and joined the church choir. Winning a place in a school for professional waiters, he instituted a career in five star restaurants in several countries. Combining his talents as a singer whilst he was waiting, he was happy to burst into song in the style of Caruso singing opera arias and other Neapolitan song.
 
Pagliari settled in the West Midlands, England in 1975, and entered the New Faces talent contest on television, where songwriter Johnny Edward was impressed with his vocals and utilised him for his ballad "Save Your Love", with the single gaining chart status internationally in the Netherlands, Belgium and Norway. The follow-up singles, "Just One More Kiss" and "Jesus Loves Us All" failed to have the same impact. Pagliari would continue performing on cruise ships, singing at his son's restaurant and recording six further solo albums.

Death
He died on 29 July 2009, aged 69, after undergoing surgery for a brain tumour.

References

1940 births
2009 deaths
Singers from Rome
Deaths from cancer in England
People from Sutton Coldfield
Italian emigrants to the United Kingdom
20th-century Italian male singers